The Under 19 Bayernliga (German: A-Jugend Bayernliga) is the second tier of under 19 youth football in Bavaria, set below the Under 19 Bundesliga South/Southwest.

Until 1996, the league was the highest tier of under 19 football, containing the youth teams of such clubs as FC Bayern Munich, TSV 1860 Munich and 1. FC Nürnberg.

History

Pre-Bayernliga era
A Bavarian championship was played from 1946 onwards, only in 1952 and 1953 was it not held. Until 1971, the Bavarian champions advanced to the Southern German under 19 championship. This competition was disbanded after 1971 in light of the inception of a German championship from 1969 onwards.

The under 19 team of the 1. FC Nürnberg started a remarkable series from 1967 onwards, reaching the Bavarian final every year until 1994, 28 times in a row! Only in 1995 did Viktoria Aschaffenburg finish above the 1. FCN.

Bayernliga era
The Bayernliga was established in 1974, operating as two regional divisions, a northern and a southern one, the A-Jugend Bayernliga Nord and the A-Jugend Bayernliga Süd. The winner of each division would then advance to the Bavarian championship final, an on-off game. The winner of this game, the Bavarian champions, then advanced to the German under 19 championship.

In 1996, the Under 19 Regionalliga South was established, relegating the two Bayernligas to second division status. From now on, the best Bavarian clubs would play in the Regionalliga and the Bayernliga champions played for promotion to this league.

Since 2001, the final between the two league winners was now played in a home-and-away format. Should each team win a game the goals scored were not taken into consideration, instead, a penalty shoot-out was used to determine the winner.

In 2003, the Under 19 Regionalliga South and the Under 19 Regionalliga Southwest merged to form the Under 19 Bundesliga South/Southwest. This changed nothing in the status of the Bayernligas as second divisions.

In the 2007–08 season, the 1. FC Nürnberg remained unbeaten throughout its 26 league games but then lost in the finals to Unterhaching.

From the 2008–09 season, the Bayernliga now operates as a single division, allowing direct promotion for its champion. Below this league, two Landesligas, north and south, were slotted in above the seven Bezirksoberligas who previously formed the tier below. A final to determine the Bavarian champions will not be necessary any more.

In 2008, the Bavarian football association had 2,013 registered under 19 teams, a 3% increase from the previous year. All up, 20,699 junior teams were registered with the BFV in 2008

Champions

Pre-Bayernliga era

Bayernliga era

From 2008 onwards, no final was played anymore:

 Bavarian champions in bold
 Source: Siegerliste der Bayerischen Meisterschaften U19 (A)-Junioren , accessed: 28 November 2008

Winners & Finalists
As of 2019, this is the standing in the all-time winners list:

National success
On Southern German and national level, the Bavarian clubs achieved the following success:

German championship
The German under 19 championship was incepted in 1969 and, as of 2019, Bavarian clubs have reached the final 15 times, winning it five times.

 Winner in bold.
Source: Alle A–Junioren–Meister  official DFB website: List of all champions, accessed: 28 November 2008

Southern German championship
The Under 19 Southern German championship was incepted in 1946 and disbanded in 1973. Bavarian clubs have won the competition 11 times.

 Source: 50 Jahre Bayerischer Fussball Verband  publisher: Bavarian FA, published: 1996, page 131, accessed: 28 November 2008

German Cup
The German under 19 cup competition was incepted in 1987 and Bavarian clubs played in the final nine times without having lost one, as of 2008. Originally, the competition was designed for the league runners–up, this was later changed and nowadays, the 21 regional cup winners qualify for it. Since 2001, a Bavarian Cup competition for the under 19 is played.

 Winner in bold.
 Source: Alle Junioren–Vereinspokalsieger  DFB website, accessed: 28 November 2008

Bavarian under 19 cup
The Bavarian under 19 cup functions as a qualifying competition for the German under 19 cup and was incepted in 2001.

League placings since 2003–04

State-wide league
The placings in the league since 2008–09, when it moved to a single-division format:

Northern and southern divisions
The placings in the northern and southern division until 2007–08, when they were abolished:

German championship winning players

1. FC Nürnberg
 1974
 Klaus Müller – Lindner – Günter Dämpfling (1) – Reiner Kraus – Kosian – Horst Weyerich – Reichenbach – Helmut Steuerwald – Suffel – Peter Sommer – Werner Dorok

FC Augsburg
 1993
 Fuchs – Frank Gerster – Thomas Meggle – Neumann – Bachthaler – Dobler – Meier – Michael Rösele – Söhner – Böhringer – Berkant – İlhan Mansız

Bayern Munich
 2001
 Philipp Heerwagen – Leonhard Haas (1) – Markus Husterer – Peter Endres – Martin Rietzler – Enzo Contento – Paul Thomik  – Barbaros Barut – Markus Feulner – Philipp Lahm – Zvjezdan Misimović (1) – Piotr Trochowski (1) – Florian Heller – Yunus Karayün
 2002
 Michael Rensing – Leonhard Haas – Alexander Aischmann – Andreas Ottl – Barbaros Barut – Michael Stegmayer – Christian Lell – Paul Thomik – Bastian Schweinsteiger – Philipp Lahm (1) – Piotr Trochowski (2) – Erdal Kilicaslan (1) – Borut Semler – Serkan Atak – Peter Endres
 2004
 Johannes Höcker – Philipp Rehm – Jan Mauersberger – Georg Niedermeier – Michael Stegmayer – Paul Thomik (1) – Andreas Ottl (1) – Rainer Storhas – Timo Heinze – José Luis Ortíz – Fabian Müller – Borut Semler (1) – Sebastian Heidinger  – Markus Steinhöfer – Marijan Holjevac
 Goals in brackets

References

Sources
 Deutschlands Fußball in Zahlen,  An annual publication with tables and results from the Bundesliga to Verbandsliga/Landesliga, publisher: DSFS
 50 Jahre Bayrischer Fussball-Verband  50-year-anniversary book of the Bavarian FA, publisher: Vindelica Verlag, published: 1996

External links 
 Bayrischer Fussball Verband (Bavarian FA)  
 Bavarian League tables and results 

Youth football in Germany
1974 establishments in West Germany
Bayernliga
Sports leagues established in 1974